Alessandro Giannessi and Gianluca Naso were the defending champions. Giannessi did not compete, while Naso partnered Alessio di Mauro, and lost in the first round to Gerard Granollers and Jordi Samper Montaña.

Hans Podlipnik Castillo and Stefano Travaglia won the title, defeating Granollers and Samper Montaña in the final, 6–2, 6–7(4–7), [10–7].

Seeds

Draw

Draw

References
 Main Draw

Morocco - Meknes - Doubles
2014 Doubles
Meknes - Doubles